Shah Wali Khan may refer to:

 Sardar Shah Wali Khan (1888-1977), a political and military figure of Afghanistan.
 Shawali Khan (born around 1963), a former Guantanamo detainee from Afghanistan.